Drabastrum is a monotypic genus of herbs or subshrubs in the family Brassicaceae. The sole species is Drabastrum alpestre (Mountain Cress) which is native to New South Wales and Victoria in Australia.

References

Brassicaceae
Flora of New South Wales
Flora of Victoria (Australia)
Monotypic Brassicaceae genera